Graham Edwards (born 21 July 1936) is an English former professional footballer who played as a forward in the Netherlands for VVV-Venlo.

References

1936 births
Living people
English footballers
Association football forwards
Eredivisie players
Eerste Divisie players
VVV-Venlo players
English expatriate footballers
English expatriate sportspeople in the Netherlands
Expatriate footballers in the Netherlands